Boolean-valued usually refers to:
 in most applied fields: something taking one of two values (example: True or False, On or Off, 1 or 0) referring to two-element Boolean algebra (the Boolean domain), e.g. Boolean-valued function or Boolean data type
 in mathematics: something taking values over an arbitrary, abstract Boolean algebra, for example Boolean-valued model

See also 
 Boolean algebra further explains the distinction

Mathematical concepts
Logic and statistics